The Central Florida Reception Center is a state prison for men located in Orlando, Orange County, Florida, which is owned and operated by the Florida Department of Corrections.  This facility was opened in 1988 (as the Orange Correctional Institution) and has a maximum capacity of 1659 prisoners, at a mix of security levels, as an inmate intake and processing center.

The Central Florida Reception Center, East Unit is an adjacent state prison for men with capacity for another 1407 prisoners.

References

Prisons in Florida
Buildings and structures in Orange County, Florida
1988 establishments in Florida